Mambra is a small village in the Thrissur district of Kerala, south India.

Geography

It is situated on the border of Ernakulam district and Thrissur district, with South Mambra in Ernakulam district and North Mambra in Trichur district. The village is on the shore of river Chalakudy Puzha. The nearest villages are Karukutty, Puliyanam, Erayamkudy, koratty.

A majority of the people in this village depend on the agriculture which includes rubber, nutmeg, rice etc. Many interstate workers from Bengal and Orissa are staying in this village for quarry-related works. It is blessed with lot of agriculture land, and the main channel of water from Chalakudy Puzha passes through this village. Geographically it is located higher than the other main cities in this area. Due to that, it is commonly called "Mambrakunnu".

Nearest Attractions 

 Nearest airport (11 km) Cochin International Airport.
 Nearest railway stations are Koratty(4 km), Karukutty(3 km), Angamaly(7 km) and  Chalakudy(9 km)
 Nearest cities (7 km) Angamaly, (9 km) Chalakudy.
 Nearest town (1.2 km) Annamanada, Koratty(4 km).
 Nearest tourism (27 km) Thumpurmuzhi Gardens, (36 km) Athirapally, (38 km) Vazhachal.

Education and Health 
Educational and Medical Institutions including

 Union Higher Secondary School, Mambra.
 Union LPS, Mambra
 Gov Block Primary Health Centre, Mambra .
 Veterinary Dispensary, Mambra.
 P.A.T Hospital, Mambra.

Religion and Pilgrimage 
There are all religious believers in Mambra, that peacefully co-exists here, each faithful to their respective beliefs and customs.

Major religious centers in Mambra include
 Muhiyudhieen Jumma Masjid, Mambra.
 Maha Deva Temple, Mambra.
 St. Joseph Church, Mambra.
 St. Kuriyakose Jacobite Church, Mambra.
 Nusruthul Islam Madrasa, Mambra
 Viswakarma Temple, Mambra
 Masjidhul Bhadriyah, Mambra
 hidayathul islam masjid, Mambra

References 

Villages in Thrissur district
Villages in Ernakulam district